Napoleon Bonaparte Charlton (May 13, 1815 – June 17, 1896) was a politician who served in the Texas House of Representatives and Texas Senate from early 1846 to late 1866.

Life
Napoleon was born on May 13, 1813, in Sumner, Tennessee to James Charlton and Rachel Blackmore. He is one of 10 children. He also had 5 children, 3 boys and 2 girls. He died on June 17, 1896, in Tyler, Texas at the age of 83.

Politics
Charlton served many terms in the Texas Hose and Texas Senate.

Here is a list of his services:
 House of Representatives
 1st representative of the Texas House of Representatives, District Liberty (February 16, 1846 – December 13, 1847)
 3rd representative of the Texas House of Representatives, District 23 (November 5, 1849 – November 3, 1851)
 4th representative of the Texas House of Representatives, District 1 (November 3, 1851 – November 7, 1853)
 5th representative of the Texas House of Representatives, District 34 (November 7, 1853 – November 5, 1855)
 6th representative of the Texas House of Representatives, District 34 (November 5, 1855 – November 2, 1857)
 9th representative of the Texas House of Representatives, District 3 (February 6, 1863 – November 2, 1863)
 Senate
 10th representative of the Texas Senate, District 2 (November 2, 1863 – August 6, 1866)

References

1815 births
1896 deaths
Members of the Texas House of Representatives
Texas state senators
19th-century American politicians